The 2018 Penn State Nittany Lions football team represented Pennsylvania State University in the 2018 NCAA Division I FBS football season. The team was led by fifth-year head coach James Franklin and played its home games in Beaver Stadium in University Park, Pennsylvania. They were a member of the East Division of the Big Ten Conference.

Penn State, coming off an 11–2, Fiesta Bowl-winning season in 2017, began the year at 10th in the preseason AP Poll. They narrowly escaped an upset in their first game of the year by defeating Appalachian State in overtime. The Nittany Lions won their first four games and entered an anticipated home game against No. 4 Ohio State at No. 9, but lost to the Buckeyes by a score of 26–27. The following week the team was upset by Michigan State on homecoming. The team rebounded with a home win against then-No. 18 Iowa, but was blown out the following week by Michigan 42–7. The Nittany Lions finished the regular season in third in the Big Ten East with a conference record of 6–3. They were invited to the Citrus Bowl, where they lost to Kentucky to finish the year at 9–4.

Senior quarterback Trace McSorley led the team in passing, finishing with 2,530 passing yards and 18 passing touchdowns to go along with 12 rushing touchdowns. He was named second team All-Big Ten by both the media and coaches. During the season, McSorely became the all-time school record holder in several categories, including career passing yards, completions, passing touchdowns, and total touchdowns responsible for. Junior running back Miles Sanders finished in second in the conference in rushing with 1,274 yards. On defense, cornerback Amani Oruwariye and lineman Yetur Gross-Matos were named first-team all-conference by the media.

Previous season
In 2017, the Nittany Lions finished with an 11–2 overall record and finished tied for second in the Big Ten East Division, with a 7–2 conference record. They finished ranked eighth nationally in the AP and Coaches Poll after a 35–28 win over Washington in the Fiesta Bowl.  This marked the school's first time finishing in the top eight in back-to-back seasons since 1993 and 1994.

On December 31, 2017, a day after the Fiesta Bowl victory, Junior running back Saquon Barkley announced his intentions to enter the NFL draft.

Offseason

Staff changes
On November 29, 2017, it was announced that offensive coordinator and quarterbacks coach Joe Moorhead was hired to be the head coach for the Mississippi State Bulldogs. Shortly after, it was reported that running backs coach and special teams coordinator Charles Huff would be joining Moorhead at Mississippi State as his assistant head coach, run game coordinator, and running backs coach. On December 1, 2017, James Franklin announced that tight ends coach Ricky Rahne would replace Moorhead as offensive coordinator and quarterbacks coach. It was also announced that former Maryland offensive line coach Tyler Bowen was hired to coach tight ends and consultant Phil Galiano was hired to coordinate special teams and assist with the defensive line. On January 12, 2018, former Army wide receivers coach David Corley Jr. was hired to the staff as the running backs coach. Corley was hired as the 10th assistant coach because of a new rule change by the NCAA, that expanded staff sizes by one. On January 24, 2018, wide receivers coach Josh Gattis announced that he would be leaving to serve as the co-offensive coordinator and wide receivers coach for the Alabama Crimson Tide. The next day it was announced that former Florida Gators running backs coach Ja'Juan Seider would be joining Penn State in the same capacity and David Corley Jr. would be coaching the wide receivers. It was also announced that defensive line coach Sean Spencer received the title of associate head coach, a title previously held by defensive coordinator Brent Pry.

Recruiting
The Nittany Lions signed 23 recruits.

2018 NFL draft

Offseason departures

Returning starters

Offense

Defense

Special teams

Position key

Preseason

Award watch lists

Personnel

Roster
Seniors Trace McSorley and Nick Scott, and junior Blake Gillikin were elected by their teammates as captains.  Running Back C. J. Holmes is a transfer from Notre Dame.  On August 4, 2018, Linebacker Manny Bowen returned to the program after being dismissed near the end of the 2017 season.

Depth chart
As of August 28, 2018

Coaching staff

Schedule

Spring game

Regular season
The team hosted two of the three non-conference games against the Appalachian State Mountaineers (first ever meeting) from the Sun Belt Conference and the Kent State Golden Flashes from the Mid-American Conference (MAC). They traveled to the Pittsburgh Panthers from the Atlantic Coast Conference (ACC).

During the 2018 Nittany Lions season, Penn State faced Big Ten conference opponents Illinois, Ohio State, Michigan State, Indiana, Iowa, Michigan, Wisconsin, Rutgers and Maryland. Their annual homecoming game was played on October 13. The 2018 regular season schedule consisted of 7 home games and 5 away.

Schedule Source:

Game summaries

Appalachian State

at Pittsburgh

Kent State

at Illinois

No. 4 Ohio State

Michigan State

at Indiana

No. 18 Iowa

at No. 5 Michigan

Wisconsin

at Rutgers

Maryland

vs. No. 16 Kentucky (Citrus Bowl)

Rankings

Awards and honors

Players drafted into the NFL

References

Penn State
Penn State Nittany Lions football seasons
Penn State Nittany Lions football